The 1958 Cleveland Browns season was the team's ninth season with the National Football League. They were 9–3 in the regular season, tied for first in the Eastern Conference with the New York Giants, who won the tiebreaker playoff.

Exhibition schedule

Regular season

Tommy O’Connell was the first MVP to be cut from a team before the start of the following season.

Schedule

Season summary
For the second straight year, one of their rivals had gotten revenge for something that had happened earlier in the decade.

After the Detroit Lions whipped the Browns 59–14 in the 1957 NFL Championship Game to atone for the 56–10 pounding they had absorbed from Cleveland in the title contest three years earlier, the 1958 New York Giants took their turn. The Giants shut out the Browns 10–0 in a tiebreaker playoff game at Yankee Stadium to determine the Eastern Conference champion. The last time the two teams met in such a special playoff contest was 1950, when Cleveland edged New York 8–3 to win the title in the American Conference, the forerunner of the Eastern Conference, and advance to the league championship game.

As was the case in 1950, the 1958 Giants also beat Cleveland twice during the regular season, 21–17 and 13–10, and the teams tied for first with a 9–3 record. The Browns went into the latter game at 9–2, needing a tie (or a win) to clinch the conference crown, and led 7–0 early in the first quarter and 10–3 in the fourth quarter. Future broadcaster Pat Summerall kicked a 49-yard field goal in a snowstorm to provide the win, even though he made barely 50 percent (12-of-23) of his attempts during the regular season. Seven days later in the tiebreaker playoff, Summerall added a 26-yard field goal in a game highlighted by the fact the Giants held hall of fame running back Jim Brown to a career-low eight yards rushing on seven carries, and limited the Browns to just 86 yards of total offense.

In the following week's NFL Championship Game at Yankee Stadium, later dubbed "The Greatest Game Ever Played," the Giants lost 23–17 in overtime to the Baltimore Colts.

Aside from the three losses to the Giants, the only team to beat the Browns in 1958 were the Detroit Lions, who gained a 30–10 decision midway through the year.

Standings

Playoffs

 Unscheduled tiebreaker game for conference title

References

External links 
 1958 Cleveland Browns at Pro Football Reference (profootballreference.com)
 1958 Cleveland Browns Statistics at jt-sw.com
 1958 Cleveland Browns Schedule at jt-sw.com
 1958 Cleveland Browns at DatabaseFootball.com  
1958 Season summary and statistics at Cleveland Browns.com

Cleveland
Cleveland Browns seasons
Cleveland Browns